Liaobei (Wade-Giles: Liaopei) also known as Liaopeh is a de jure province of the Republic of China under ROC law as the government of the Republic of China formally claims to be the sole legitimate government of China. Located in Manchuria, the major part of the area of Liaobei constitutes the parts of  province which is now in Inner Mongolia, now under the de facto jurisdiction of the People's Republic of China. Its de jure capital is located in Liaoyuan City (present-day Shuangliao, Jilin), but the de facto capital is at Siping City since Liaoyuan was already occupited by the Communists.

Today the area of the former Liaobei province spread across Inner Mongolia, Jilin and Liaoning.

As the ROC does not recognize changes in administrative divisions made by the PRC, official maps sanctioned by the ROC government shows Liaobei Province in its pre-1949 borders.

See also

References

Provinces of the Republic of China (1912–1949)
Manchuria
Subdivisions of Manchukuo
Territorial disputes of the Republic of China